Dance Deewane 2 is the Season 2 of Indian dance reality television series Dance Deewane that premiered on 15 June 2019 on Colors TV. The season is hosted by Arjun Bijlani.

Judges 
The following are the three judges of the season:

Madhuri Dixit
Tushar Kalia
Shashank Khaitan

Contestants 
23 contestants were chosen, 8 from 1st & 2nd generation and 7 from 3rd generation.

1st Generation: Kids
2nd Generation: Youth
3rd Generation: Seniors

 Indicates the contestant is male.
 Indicates the contestant is female.

 Quit
 Eliminated

Wild-Cards

Summary 

 The contestant is from 1st Generation.
 The contestant is from 2nd Generation.
 The contestant is from 3rd Generation.

 The contestant was the Ultimate Winner.
 The contestant was the Winner of their Generation.
 The contestants were Finalists & eliminated during the final.
 The contestant received all 3 Plays & moved on to next round.
 The contestant received 2 Plays & moved on to next round.
 The contestant was safe.
 The contestant was got only 1 Play.
 The contestant was in the bottom. 
 The contestant received Rewind & was Eliminated.
 The contestant was injured and had to leave the competition.

Guests

References

Indian dance television shows